Trinity Christian Academy (TCA) is a conservative non-denominational Christian school in Addison, Texas, a suburb of Dallas. The school was founded in 1970 when racial desegregation of public schools prompted the creation of many segregation academies which enrolled only white students. The White enrollment is now 80%, in a community that is 48% White. The school serves pre-kindergarten through grade 12.

History
The school opened in 1970 with an all-white student body amidst the racial desegregation of public schools. In 1972, the school's enrollment surged. The headmaster, David Coterill, attributed the enrollment increase to "parents [who] are unsure and afraid of an unsettled situation". Coterill claimed that the school was not intended to be an "escape hatch for segregation", but also acknowledged that interest in private schools like Trinity "was initially stirred up by the busing situation". He attributed the lack of Black students to their inability to do the schoolwork, stating that "We have had some Blacks apply from the area, but the pathetic situation is that they cannot make the preliminary testing." He said the school would like to offer minority student scholarships, "but we just don't have the money now." Dallas city council member George Allen countered that "by perpetuating segregation, they are perpetuating bigotry." The school's director of student development said in 2016 that "We don’t look like heaven. My heart broke for that."

In 2004 the administration expelled a student for his sexual orientation. James Barnett was expelled for what school officials described as his immoral behavior and supporting an immoral cause, in reference to Barnett's orientation and involvement in the creation of a social network for gay youth.

In 2012, TCA opened an art gallery which shows student works from grades K-12, as well as hosting other artists and their work.

In 2012, a ponzi scheme led by relatives of a teacher at Trinity took 80 fraudulent investments for their scheme related to a VOIP company named Usee. The inctictment stated they were "Focusing their securities offerings on evangelical Christians".

An annual fundraiser in 2013 for the school was headlined by Tim Tebow.

Former NFL coach Mike Singletary coached the Trinity football team in 2018-2019, departing after they went 1-21 over two seasons.

Demographics 
In the 2019–20 school year, of the 1,379 students in grades PK-12, 1,101 (80%) were White, 85 (6%) Asian, 76 (6%) Hispanic, 59 (4%) Black, 9 (0.7%) two or more races, and 4 (0.3%) American Indian/Alaska Native.

Athletics
In 1997 the baseball team won the Texas Association of Private and Parochial Schools Class 5A championship.

Notable alumni
Chace Crawford – actor
Jason Hursh – baseball player
Beau Morgan – former NFL player
Blane Morgan – college football coach
Elizabeth Neumann - former George W. Bush Administration and Trump Administration official
David Purcey – former baseball player
Daniel Roseberry, fashion designer for Maison Schiaparelli
Will Zalatoris - professional golfer

References

External links

Official website

Christian schools in Texas
Educational institutions established in 1970
High schools in Dallas County, Texas
LGBT and education
LGBT and Christianity
Private K-12 schools in Texas
Segregation academies in Texas
Addison, Texas
1970 establishments in Texas